Euseius rubicolus is a species of mite in the family Phytoseiidae.

References

rubicolus
Articles created by Qbugbot
Animals described in 1964